The Supreme Court of the State of New York, Appellate Division, First Judicial Department, or simply the First Department, is one of the four geographical components of the New York Supreme Court, Appellate Division, the intermediate appellate court of the State of New York. Its courthouse is located in Manhattan, New York City.

Jurisdiction
The First Department of the Appellate Division holds jurisdiction over the Counties of New York and the Bronx. Appeals are taken to the Appellate Division, as a matter of right, in civil and criminal cases, from the Supreme Court, Surrogate's Court, Family Court, and Court of Claims.

Along with the state's other three Appellate Departments, it shares responsibility for all admissions to the New York bar. Under the state's bar admission rules, all bar applicants must be interviewed in person by one of the Appellate Departments. The First Department admits only residents of Manhattan and the Bronx, with all other applicants being admitted by other Departments. However, once admitted by one department, a new attorney may practice in any New York state court.

Case load
Over 3,000 appeals, 6,000 motions, and 1,000 interim applications are determined each year.

Current justices

Former justices
George C. Barrett (1896–1900)
Charles H. Van Brunt (1896–1905, P.J. 1896–1905)
William Rumsey (1896–1901) 
Pardon C. Williams (1896–1898) 
Morgan J. O’Brien (1896–1906, P.J. 1905–1906)
Edward Patterson (1896–1910, P.J. 1906–1910) 
George L. Ingraham (1896–1915, P.J. 1910–1915)
Alton B. Parker (1897)
Chester B. McLaughlin (1898–1917) 
Edward W. Hatch (1900–1905)
Frank C. Laughlin (1901–1922) 
James W. Houghton (1905–1910)
John P. Clarke (1905–1926, P.J. 1916–1926)
John S. Lambert (1906–1908)
Francis M. Scott (1906–1918) 
Nathan L. Miller (1910–1913)
Victor J. Dowling (1911–1931, P.J. 1927–1931)
Henry D. Hotchkiss (1913–1915)
Walter L. Smith (1915–1924)
Alfred R. Page (1916–1923)
Vernon M. Davis (1916–1918)
Clarence J. Shearn (1916–1919) 
Edgar S.K. Merrell (1918–1935)
Eugene A. Philbin (1920)
Samuel Greenbaum (1920–1922) 
Edward R. Finch (1922–1935, P.J. 1931–1935)
John V. McAvoy (1923–1937) 
Francis W. Martin (1923–1947, P.J. 1935–1947) 
William P. Burr (1924–1926) 
Robert F. Wagner (1926) 
James O'Malley (1927–1942) 
Joseph M. Proskauer (1927–1930) 
Henry L. Sherman (1930–1933) 
Alfred H. Townley (1931–1946) 
Edward J. Glennon (1933–1954) 
Irwin Untermyer (1933–1945) 
Edward S. Dore (1936–1954)
Albert Cohn (1936–1955)
Joseph M. Callahan (1937–1955) 
David W. Peck (1945–1957, P.J. 1947–1957)
Isidor Wasservogel (1945)
John Van Voorhis (1947–1953) 
Bernard L. Shientag (1947–1952) 
Francis D. McCurn (1951)
Christopher J. Heffernan (1951–1952)
Charles D. Breitel (1952–1966)
Francis Bergan (1952–1963)
Sydney F. Foster (1952–1953) 
Earle C. Bastow (1953–1970)
Bernard Botein (1953–1968, P.J. 1958–1968)
Benjamin J. Rabin (1955–1968)
Joseph A. Cox (1955–1956)
Martin M. Frank (1956–1960) 
Francis L. Valente (1956–1966) 
James B.M. McNally (1957–1972) 
Harold A. Stevens (1958–1974, 1975–1977, P.J. 1969–1974, 1975–1977)
Robert E. Noonan (1960–1964)
Samuel W. Eager (1960–1972)
Aron Steuer (1961–1974)
G. Robert Witmer (1963–1971)
Ellis J. Staley, Jr. (1964–1968)
Louis J. Capozzoli (1966–1977)
George Tilzer (1967–1975)
Owen McGivern (1967–1975, P.J. 1974–1975)
Daniel E. Macken (1968–1974)
Arthur Markewich (1969–1982)
Emilio Nunez (1969–1977)
Francis T. Murphy (1971–1997, P.J. 1977–1997)
Theodore R. Kupferman (1971–1996)
Myles J. Lane (1973–1979)
Vincent A. Lupiano (1974–1982) 
J. Robert Lynch (1974–1987)
Paul J. Yesawich, Jr. (1974–1981) 
Harold Birns (1975–1982)
Samuel J. Silverman (1975–1984) 
Herbert B. Evans (1977–1979) 
Arnold L. Fein (1977–1986)
Leonard H. Sandler (1977–1988) 
Joseph P. Sullivan (1978–2007, P.J. 2000–2001)
Max Bloom (1979–1986)
David Ross (1979–1997)
John Carro (1979–1994)
Sidney H. Asch (1982–1995) 
E. Leo Milonas (1982–1993, 1996–1998)
Bentley Kassal (1982–1993)
Fritz W. Alexander II (1982–1985)
Ernst H. Rosenberger (1985–2003) 
Betty Weinberg Ellerin (1985–2005, P.J. 1999) 
Richard W. Wallach (1986–2003) 
George Bundy Smith (1987–1992) 
Israel Rubin (1989–2002)
Eugene L. Nardelli (1993–2010) 
Milton L. Williams (1993–2008, P.J. 2002)
Peter Tom (1994-2019, Acting P.J. 2007, 2009, 2016–2017)
Richard Andrias (1996-2018)
Nicholas Colabella (1997–1998)
Alfred D. Lerner (1998–2004, P.J. 1998) 
David B. Saxe (1998–2017)
John T. Buckley (1999–2010, P.J. 2003–2006)
George D. Marlow (2001–2008)
Luis A. Gonzalez (2002–2015, P.J. 2009–2015)
John Sweeny (2004-2019)
James M. McGuire (2005–2011) 
Bernard J. Malone, Jr. (2005–2008) 
E. Michael Kavanagh (2006–2008) 
Jonathan Lippman (2007–2009, P.J. 2007–2009)
James M. Catterson (2004–2012)
Karla Moskowitz (2008–2017)
Helen E. Freedman (2008–2014)
Leland G. DeGrasse (2008–2015)
Sheila Abdus-Salaam (2009–2013)
Nelson S. Román (2009–2013)
Rosalyn Richter (2009–2020)
Darcel D. Clark (2012–2015)
Paul G. Feinman (2012–2017)
Marcy L. Kahn (2016-2019)

Notable cases
Pando v. Fernandez
People v. Jovanovic
Stambovsky v. Ackley

See also
New York Supreme Court, Appellate Division
New York State Supreme Court, Appellate Division, Second Department

External links

How We Operate: An Inside Look at the Appellate Division, First Department

New York Supreme Court, Appellate Division
Rose Hill, Manhattan
Organizations based in Manhattan